Schnaittach is a market town in Middle Franconia, Bavaria, Germany.

Geography

Schnaittach is on the river Schnaittach, a tributary of the Pegnitz.

History
Schnaittach was first mentioned in 1011. Until 1806 the Christian population of Schnaittach was Catholic, in contrast to the surrounding areas. Schnaittach has had a large Jewish community since the 15th century. Today, the building complex of the synagogue houses a branch of the Jewish Museum of Franconia (the main museum is in Fürth).

Twin towns
 Twinned with Frohnleiten, Austria
 "Friendship" with Schlettau, Saxony

References

External links
 Official town Web site 
 Fortifications near Schnaittach 
 Jewish Museum of Franconia 

Nürnberger Land